Didymocyrtis is also a zoological genus of spumellarian Radiolaria.

Didymocyrtis is a genus of lichenicolous fungi in the family Phaeosphaeriaceae. The genus was circumscribed by Finnish lichenologist Edvard August Vainio in 1921, with Didymocyrtis consimilis assigned as the type species.

Species
Didymocyrtis assimilis 
Didymocyrtis azorica 
Didymocyrtis banksiae 
Didymocyrtis brachylaenae 
Didymocyrtis bryonthae 
Didymocyrtis canariensis 
Didymocyrtis cladoniicola 
Didymocyrtis consimilis 
Didymocyrtis epiphyscia 
Didymocyrtis foliaceiphila 
Didymocyrtis graphidacearum 
Didymocyrtis grumantiana 
Didymocyrtis infestans 
Didymocyrtis kaernefeltii 
Didymocyrtis melanelixiae 
Didymocyrtis micropunctum 
Didymocyrtis microxanthoriae 
Didymocyrtis peltigerae 
Didymocyrtis physciae 
Didymocyrtis pini 
Didymocyrtis pseudeverniae 
Didymocyrtis ramalinae 
Didymocyrtis rhizoplacae 
Didymocyrtis septata 
Didymocyrtis slaptonensis 
Didymocyrtis thamnoliicola 
Didymocyrtis trassii 
Didymocyrtis xanthomendozae

References

Pleosporales
Dothideomycetes genera
Taxa named by Edvard August Vainio
Taxa described in 1921
Lichenicolous fungi